The Forte VFX1 was a consumer-level virtual reality headset marketed during the mid-1990s. It comprised a helmet, a handheld controller, and an ISA interface board, and offered head tracking, stereoscopic 3D, and stereo audio.

History
The VFX1 was developed in the early 1990s by Forte Technologies, Incorporated. It was released in 1995 with an MSRP of US$695 and an average retail price of $599, and was sold in the US in retail stores including CompUSA and Babbage's. It was superseded by Interactive Imaging Systems' VFX3D in 2000.

Features

Visual: The helmet featured dual 0.7" 263 × 230 LCD displays capable of 256 colors. Optics comprised dual lenses with adjustable focus and interpupillary distance. Field of view was 45 degrees diagonally.

Auditory: The helmet included built-in stereo speakers and a condenser microphone. Audio signals were routed to the sound card's line in/out jacks.

Tracking: Head movements were tracked with internal sensors for pitch (70 degrees), roll (70 degrees), and yaw (360 degrees). A hand-held controller called the CyberPuck offered three buttons and internal sensors for pitch and roll. It could emulate a mouse and was connected to the helmet by an ACCESS.bus interface cable.

Interface: Audio, video, and tracking information was transmitted through the VIP Board, a 16-bit ISA card that received video input from the video card's 26-pin VESA feature connector and routed audio signals to the sound card's line in/out through external 1/8" audio jacks. Audio, video, and tracking data was exchanged with the headset over a single proprietary 8-foot cable, which could be daisy-chained for improved mobility.

System requirements
 IBM-Compatible PC with 386 CPU
 VGA video card with 26-pin VESA feature connector
 16-bit ISA expansion slot for VIP board
 MS-DOS 5.0 or later
 500 KB free hard-drive space for drivers and utilities
 20 KB conventional memory for drivers
 Optional: stereo sound card

References

External links
 
 Virtual-Reality headset
 

Products introduced in 1995
Virtual reality headsets